Gustavsbergs Idrottsförening, Gustavsbergs IF, is a multi-sport club in Värmdö Municipality in Sweden, founded in 1906.

The bandy team of the club has regularly been playing in Allsvenskan, the second level league of bandy in Sweden, since the inauguration of the modern Allsvenskan in 2007. The team was relegated to Division 1 for the 2011–12 season but got a promotion to Allsvenskan again for the next season.

References

External links
 http://www7.idrottonline.se/GustavsbergsIFBK-Bandy/

Bandy clubs in Sweden
Bandy clubs established in 1906
1906 establishments in Sweden
Sport in Värmdö